Veronica Klinefelt is an American politician who is the state Senator representing Michigan's 11th Senate district, following the 2022 Michigan Senate election. She is a member of the Democratic Party.

Political career
Klinefelt began her political career as a member of the East Detroit School Board, serving for six years. She was then the mayor pro tem of Eastpointe for six years. She served on the Macomb County Board of Commissioners for ten years, representing Eastpointe.

Michigan Senate

In 2022, Klinefelt ran against Michael D. MacDonald (who was the incumbent in Michigan's 10th Senate district) in Michigan's 11th Senate district. MacDonald was redistricted to the 11th Senate district following the 2020 United States redistricting cycle. Klinefelt defeated MacDonald in the general election with 52.69% of the vote, due to strong support in her native Eastpointe as well as in the Wayne County portion of her district.

Electoral history

References

External links

Living people
County commissioners in Michigan
Democratic Party Michigan state senators
Women state legislators in Michigan
People from Eastpointe, Michigan
School board members in Michigan
21st-century American politicians
21st-century American women politicians
Year of birth missing (living people)